Brian Farrell is a Gaelic footballer from Nobber, County Meath, Ireland. He plays for the Meath county team and his local club Nobber. He first came to national attention when he was part of the Meath team that made it to the 2002 All-Ireland Minor Football Championship final but lost out to Derry having already been beaten by Longford in the Leinster Championship final. The following year, he was part of the Meath side that won the Leinster and All-Ireland Junior Football Championships. At club level, he has won County and Leinster Junior medals in 2002 and an All-Ireland Junior Club Football Championship medal in 2003.  In 2010, Farrell won a Meath Intermediate Football Championship medal.

References

Year of birth missing (living people)
20th-century births
Living people
Meath inter-county Gaelic footballers
Nobber Gaelic footballers